Cholamine chloride hydrochloride is one of Good's buffers with a pH in the physiological range. Its pKa at 20°C is 7.10, making it useful in cell culture work. Its ΔpKa/°C is -0.027 and it has a solubility in water at 0°C of 4.2M.

References

Buffer solutions
Quaternary ammonium compounds
Amines
Chlorides
Acid salts